Boulder Junction Airport  is a public use airport located two nautical miles (4 km) north of the central business district of Boulder Junction, a town in Vilas County, Wisconsin, United States. It is owned by the Town of Boulder Junction.

Although many U.S. airports use the same three-letter location identifier for the FAA and IATA, this facility is assigned BDJ by the FAA but has no designation from the IATA (which assigned BDJ to Syamsudin Noor Airport in Banjarmasin, South Kalimantan, Indonesia).

Facilities and aircraft 
Boulder Junction Airport covers an area of 40 acres (16 ha) at an elevation of 1,666 feet (508 m) above mean sea level. It has two runways with turf surfaces: 5/23 is 3,800 by 165 feet (1,158 x 50 m) and 16/34 is 3,201 by 160 feet (976 x 49 m).

For the 12-month period ending August 20, 2020, the airport had 450 aircraft operations, an average of 38 per month: 89% general aviation and 11% air taxi. 
In January 2023, there were no aircraft based at this airport.

See also 
 List of airports in Wisconsin

References

External links 
  at Wisconsin DOT Airport Directory

Airports in Wisconsin
Buildings and structures in Vilas County, Wisconsin